Fiskville may refer to:

CFA Training College, Fiskville, Victoria, Australia
Fiskville, Indiana, an unincorporated community